The IIFA Award for Star Debut of the Year – Female is given by the International Indian Film Academy as part of its annual award ceremony to recognise a female actor who has delivered an outstanding performance in her debut film. Originally known as the "IIFA Award for Fresh Face of the Year (Female)", it was officially given its new title in 2005. During its inaugural year in 2001, four separate actresses were presented with an award.

Superlatives
 Only five actresses who won was also nominated in the Best Actress category in the same year; In chronological order they are, Gracy Singh (2002), Vidya Balan (2006), Kangana Ranaut (2007), Deepika Padukone (2008) and Asin (2009).
 Only three actresses who won was also nominated in the Best Supporting Actress category in the same year; In chronological order they are, Bipasha Basu (2002), Parineeti Chopra (2012) and Disha Patani (2017). Parineeti Chopra is the only actress who won both the awards in the same year.
 Kareena Kapoor, Vidya Balan, Kangana Ranaut ,Kriti Sanon and Deepika Padukone are the only recipients who also won the IIFA Award for Best Actress later.
 Kangana Ranaut and Parineeti Chopra are the only recipients who also won the IIFA Award for Best Supporting Actress. While Chopra won in the same year, Ranaut won it later in the year 2009.
 Kangana Ranaut is the only recipient who won both Best Actress and Best Supporting Actress  award.

Winners

2000s
 2001Kareena Kapoor – Refugee as Nazneen "Naaz" Ahmed (tied with) Kim Sharma, Preeti Jhangiani and Shamita Shetty – Mohabbatein as Sanjana, Kiran and Ishika Dhanrajgir
 2002Bipasha Basu – Ajnabee as Sonia/Neeta (tied with) Gracy Singh – Lagaan as Gauri
 2003Esha Deol – Koi Mere Dil Se Poochhe as Esha Singh
 2004Amrita Rao  – Ishq Vishk
 2005Ayesha Takia Azmi – Taarzan: The Wonder Car as Priya
 2006Vidya Balan – Parineeta as Lalita
 2007Kangana Ranaut – Gangster as Simran
 2008Deepika Padukone – Om Shanti Om as Shantipriya/Sandhya (Sandy)
 2009Asin – Ghajini as Kalpana Shetty

2010s
 2010Jacqueline Fernandez – Aladin as Jasmine (tied with) Mahi Gill – Dev.D as Parminder (Paro)
 2011Sonakshi Sinha – Dabangg as Rajjo
 2012Parineeti Chopra – Ladies vs Ricky Bahl as Dimple Chaddha
 2013Yami Gautam – Vicky Donor as Ashima Roy Arora
 2014Vaani Kapoor – Shuddh Desi Romance as Tara
 2015Kriti Sanon – Heropanti as Dimpy
 2016Bhumi Pednekar – Dum Laga Ke Haisha as Sandhya Verma
 2017Disha Patani – M.S. Dhoni: The Untold Story as Priyanka Jha
 2018Not awarded
 2019Sara Ali Khan – Kedarnath as Mandakani "Mukku" Mishra2020s
 2020Ananya Panday – Student of the Year 2 as Shreya Randhawa 2022Sharvari Wagh – Bunty Aur Babli 2 as Sonia "Babli" Rawat'''

See also
International Indian Film Academy Awards
IIFA Award for Star Debut of the Year – Male

References

International Indian Film Academy Awards
Film awards for debut actress